Mission to Zephor is a 1980 role-playing game adventure for Traveller published by Group One.

Plot summary
Mission to Zephor is the second of Group One's approved Traveller adventures, and is a mercenary mission to save the kidnapped son of an interstellar mining mogul from a group of armadillo-like aliens on a burned-out world.

Publication history
Mission to Zephor was published in 1980 by Group One as a 16-page book with a map.

Reception
William A. Barton reviewed Mission to Zephor in The Space Gamer No. 35. Barton commented that "Mission to Zephor shows definite improvement on the part of Group One in their Traveller adventure development and should provide most players with an exciting and challenging role-playing session."

References

Role-playing game supplements introduced in 1980
Traveller (role-playing game) adventures